Charlotte Kool (born 6 May 1999) is a Dutch professional racing cyclist, who currently rides for UCI Women's World Tour Team . In October 2020, she rode in the 2020 Three Days of Bruges–De Panne race in Belgium.

Major results
2016
 2nd Road race, National Junior Road Championships
2019
 2nd MerXem Classic
2020
 2nd Grote Prijs Euromat
 6th Omloop van het Hageland
2021
 1st Grand Prix d'Isbergues
 1st stage 2a, Baloise Ladies Tour
 2nd Grand Prix du Morbihan Féminin
 2nd Drentse Acht van Westerveld
 10th Scheldeprijs
2022
 1st 
 1st stage 3, Holland Ladies Tour 
 2nd stage 3 and 5, 3rd stage 1 Giro d'Italia Donne
 6th Drentse Acht van Westerveld
 10th Scheldeprijs
2023
1st and 4th (last) stage of the UAE Women's Tour

References

External links

1999 births
Living people
Dutch female cyclists
Place of birth missing (living people)
People from Blaricum
Cyclists from North Holland
21st-century Dutch women